Fritz Tillmann (December 13, 1910 – October 30, 1986) was a German actor.

Selected filmography

 Hoegler's Mission (1950) - Fritz Rottmann
 The Council of the Gods (1950) - Dr. Hans Scholz
 Master of Life and Death (1955) - Dr. Peter
 Sacred Lie (1955)
 The Plot to Assassinate Hitler (1955) - General Henning von Tresckow
 The Major and the Bulls (1955) - Major William Sunlet
 The Girl from Flanders (1956) - Hauptmann Lüdemann
 Love (1956) - Herr Ballard
 The Story of Anastasia (1956) - Baron von Pleskau
 Von der Liebe besiegt (1956) - Leo Seduc, Marios Compagnon
 King in Shadow (1957) - Count Rantzau
 ...und die Liebe lacht dazu (1957) - Jan Dirksen
 All Roads Lead Home (1957) - Dr. Jacobs
 Doctor Crippen Lives (1958) - Kriminalinspektor Steen
 Confess, Doctor Corda (1958) - Oberinspektor Dr. Pohlhammer
 Es war die erste Liebe (1958) - Andreas Bergmann
 Der Schinderhannes (1958) - Hans Bast
 Skandal um Dodo (1959) - Baldur von Dieringen
 The Man Who Sold Himself (1959) - Dr. Schilling
 As the Sea Rages (1959) - Captain Stassi
 The Goose of Sedan (1959) - Hauptmann Knöpfer
 Hauptmann - deine Sterne (1960) - Arnold Steif, Bürgermeister
 My Husband, the Economic Miracle (1961) - Alexander Engelmann
 Mann im Schatten (1961) - Born, Kriminalrat
 Two Among Millions (1961) - Petersen
  (1961) - General von Felseneck
  (1961) - General von Felseneck
 Auf Wiedersehen (1961) - George Dalton
 Das Mädchen und der Staatsanwalt (1962) - Dr. Stoll, Verteidiger
 Das schwarz-weiß-rote Himmelbett (1962) - Schuldirektor
 ...und ewig knallen die Räuber (1962) - Fürst Zeno
The Curse of the Yellow Snake (1963) - Joe Bray
 Moral 63 (1963) - Eduard Meyer-Cleve, Industrieller
 The House in Montevideo (1963) - Bürgermeister
 Das große Liebesspiel (1963) - Gerhard Themann
 The Secret of Dr. Mabuse (1964) - Dr. Krishna (voice, uncredited)
 The Monster of London City (1964) - Sir George
 Praetorius (1965) - Dr. Klotz
 Hocuspocus (1966) - Staatsanwalt
 In Frankfurt sind die Nächte heiß (1966) - Rudolf Nickel
 Onkel Filser (1966) - Bezirksamtmann Traugott Stiebner
 Zärtliche Haie (1967) - Admiral
 Das große Glück (1967) - Nic Parnassis
 The Heathens of Kummerow (1967) - Müller Düker
 On the Reeperbahn at Half Past Midnight (1969) - Christof Lauritz
 The Priest of St. Pauli (1970) - Nieby (voice, uncredited)
 Die Feuerzangenbowle (1970) - Direktor Knauer
 Twenty Girls and the Teachers (1971) - Dr. Birnbaum
 Wir hau'n den Hauswirt in die Pfanne (1971) - Hugo Zwicknagel
 Morgen fällt die Schule aus (1971) - Kurt Nietnagel
 Käpt'n Rauhbein aus St. Pauli (1971) - Konsul Armin von Prossnitz
 Three Men in the Snow (1974) - Kühne
 One or the Other of Us (1974) - Dr. Sievers
  (1977) - Hirsch
  (1983, TV film) - Karl Gross

External links
 

1910 births
1986 deaths
German male film actors
German male television actors
Actors from Frankfurt
20th-century German male actors